The following is a list of films shot, at least in part, in Riverside, California.

The films shot at the Riverside International Raceway and at March Air Force Base are outside the Riverside city limits, but they have been included because both locations are closely associated with the city of Riverside.  The Riverside International Raceway no longer exists, and March Air Force Base has been renamed the March Joint Air Reserve Base, now more closely associated with Moreno Valley, California.

See also

 List of films and TV series set in Palm Springs, California
 List of films shot in Palm Springs, California

References

External links
Internet Movie Database. Titles with locations including Riverside, California
Filming in Riverside, California

Films
List of films shot in Riverside
Lists of films shot in the United States
Films shot in Riverside
Riverside